Vojtěch Sucharda (6 January 1884, in Nová Paka – 31 October 1968, in Prague) was a Czech sculptor, woodcarver and puppeteer.

Life
Sucharda was born into an artistic family as the son of sculptor Antonín Sucharda, Jr. (1843–1911). He was the brother of sculptor Stanislav Sucharda (1866–1916), artist Anna Boudová Suchardová (1870–1940), sculptor and puppeteer Bohuslav Sucharda (1878–1927) and painter Miroslava Suchardová (1889–1965).

Career
In 1913 Sucharda was invited to collaborate on plastics for the Koruna Palace at the Wenceslas Square. He made his possibly most important work, three monumental figures of soldiers, and the ornamental crown on the top. Sucharda was the founder of Prague's Říše Loutek Theatre ("Puppet Empire") in 1920, where all the Sucharda family had worked for almost forty years. He is known for restoring the wooden figures of the apostles on the Prague Astronomical Clock, which had been heavily damaged by enemy fire in mid-May 1945.

Sucharda wrote a letter detailing the difficult conditions in Prague at the time, which he hid in a metal case inside the restored statue of the apostle St. Thomas. His hidden message was discovered 70 years later in 2018, when restorers noticed that one of the statues was heavier than the rest and an x-ray revealed the hidden message.

Work
As an architectural sculptor, Sucharda's work includes:
 the two seated figures flanking the entrance to the Museum of Eastern Bohemia in Hradec Králové, for architect Jan Kotěra, 1908–1912
 the three figures at the crown of the Koruna Palace at the Wenceslas Square in Prague, 1912–1914
 work at the St. Vitus Cathedral, Prague

References

1884 births
1968 deaths
Czech sculptors
Czech male sculptors
Czech architectural sculptors
Czech puppeteers
20th-century sculptors
People from Nová Paka
Czechoslovak sculptors
Sculptors from the Austro-Hungarian Empire